Neuenegg railway station is a railway station in the municipality of Neuenegg, in the Swiss canton of Bern. It is located on the standard gauge Flamatt–Laupen line of the Sensetalbahn.

History 
Between 2019 and 2021 the station was rebuilt with two new -long side platforms, connected by an underpass. The station re-opened, with the rest of the line, in April 2021.

Services 
 the following services stop at Neuenegg:

References

External links 
 
 

Railway stations in the canton of Bern
Sensetalbahn stations